Stranger Things: Music from the Netflix Original Series, Season 4 is the non-original composition soundtrack companion to the fourth season of the Netflix series Stranger Things. The album, which includes sixteen popular period songs used in the show, was released digitally in two parts by Legacy Recordings on May 27, 2022 and July 1, 2022, to coincide with the release of the first and second volumes of the season.

Track listing

Charts

Weekly charts

Year-end charts

Certifications

Release history

References

Music of Stranger Things
Television soundtracks
2022 soundtrack albums
2022 compilation albums
Soundtrack compilation albums
Legacy Recordings soundtracks